The stalked trumpet jelly (Depastromorpha africana), is a species of stalked jellyfish in the family Depastridae. It is the only member of the genus Depastromorpha.

Description
This small stalked jellyfish grows up to 2 cm in height and may be pale to reddish in colour. It has a wrinkled body column and multiple stalked tentacles with knobbed ends surrounding the mouth.

Distribution
This species has been found only around the South African coast from the Cape Peninsula to Hermanus from the shore to shallow subtidal. It is possibly endemic to this region.

Ecology
This stalked jelly is usually found on seaweeds, particularly Caulerpa filiformis.

References 

Haliclystidae
Animals described in 1935